The Pardo River is a river in southeastern Brazil. For all of its length, it forms the border between the states of São Paulo and Paraná. It is a right tributary of the Ribeira de Iguape River, which flows into the Atlantic Ocean.

See also
List of rivers of São Paulo
List of rivers of Paraná

References
Brazilian Ministry of Transport

Rivers of São Paulo (state)
Rivers of Paraná (state)